Dr. Marguerite Rawalt (16 October 1895 – 16 December 1989) was an American writer and lawyer who lobbied in Congress on behalf of women's rights. She worked for the Internal Revenue Service for 30 years, and served on the board of directors for numerous interest groups relating to women's rights issues. Rawalt was a member of the National Presbyterian Church.

Early life
Rawalt was the oldest of three children, and was born in Prairie City, Illinois. Her family eventually moved to Texas and settled there. She attended the University of Texas in Austin for one year, then taught high school math in Lorena, Texas. From 1921–1924 she worked as secretary to Texas governor, Pat M. Neff. She received her bachelor's law degree in 1933 and her master's law degree in 1936 from George Washington Law School. In 1933, she started working as an attorney in the office of chief counsel for the Bureau of Internal Revenue.

Women's issues and law
In 1943, Rawalt was elected as president of the Federal Bar Association, the first woman to hold the position. During 1943 she also served as president of the National Association of Women Lawyers. In 1966, Rawalt became a member of the National Organization for Women, and acted as their first legal counsel.

Rawalt became involved with President Kennedy's Commission on the Status of Women under the invitation of Esther Peterson. In 1964, Marguerite Rawalt wrote to members of Business and Professional Women and Zonta International, asking them to lobby for the passage of provision VII of the Civil Rights Act of 1964, which prohibited discrimination by employers on the basis of sex. In 1972, Rawalt founded the Marguerite Rawalt Legal Defense Fund, a group focused on funding legal cases involving women's equity, particularly relating to financial equity.

She retired from the IRS in 1965, having been employed by them for 30 years.

See also
 National Organization for Women (NOW)
 Women's rights

References

External links

 In Memoriam: Marguerite Rawalt
 Harvard University Library - Rawalt, Marguerite

1895 births
1989 deaths
20th-century American lawyers
American lobbyists
American Presbyterians
George Washington University Law School alumni
Illinois lawyers
People from McDonough County, Illinois
American women's rights activists
20th-century American women lawyers
National Organization for Women people